Jason Croker (born 10 March 1973) is an Australian former professional rugby league footballer. An Australian international and New South Wales State of Origin representative utility player, he previously played club football in the NRL for the Canberra Raiders, with whom he won the 1994 Winfield Cup and set club records for both highest total games and tries. Croker saw out his career with French Super League club Catalans Dragons.

Croker competed in and won the Gladiator Individual Sports Athletes Challenge in 1995.

Playing career

Canberra
Croker was named the Canberra Raiders' rookie of the year in 1991 and he went on to play somewhat of a utility position over his long career, filling into many spots throughout his team. His 120 tries for Canberra was a club record until it was surpassed by Jarrod Croker and in 2000 he was named the Raiders' player of the year. He also gained selection in Australia's 2000 World Cup winning squad.

In 2006, Croker played his 300th game for Canberra, becoming the first to achieve this honour for the club.

In Croker's last game in Canberra he was given the keys to the city by Chief Minister Jon Stanhope in front of over 21,000 fans.

Catalans Dragons
Croker signed a two-year deal to play for the French team the Catalans Dragons from 2007, which, after two successful campaigns, was extended by a further year in 2008. Croker's experience was of increasing value to the fledgling French side, and his physical fitness and hunger for the game are admired by many. He is regarded fondly by many Catalans Dragons fans for an audacious drop-goal scored in a 29–22 win over the Bradford Bulls at Odsal in March 2007.

Croker was the oldest player in the Super League until retiring at the end of the 2009 season at age 36.

Return to Australia
He currently acts as a player-coach for the Gungahlin Bulls in the Canberra Raiders Cup. 
Croker was named in Canberra's 2016 NRL Auckland Nines squad.

Representative
Country: Played two games for Country
State Of Origin: Played 5 games in total for New South Wales
International: Played 4 tests for Australia in the 2000 World Cup

References

External links
Super League profile
Shock Aussie call-up for duo

1973 births
Living people
Australia national rugby league team players
Australian rugby league players
Canberra Raiders players
Catalans Dragons players
Country New South Wales Origin rugby league team players
New South Wales Rugby League State of Origin players
Rugby league players from New South Wales
Rugby league utility players